The Adeyemi College of Education is a federal government higher education institution located in Ondo City, Ondo State, Nigeria. It is affiliated with Obafemi Awolowo University for its degree programmes. Adeyemi College of Education was named after Canon M. C. Adeyemi (one of the earliest educationists in Yorubaland) in recognition of his immense contribution to educational development in the then Ondo Province.

It was established in 1963 to produce qualified teachers to teach in secondary schools and teachers' training colleges and to conduct research and experiments on methods of teaching at all levels of education in Nigeria. It formally commenced operations on 22 May 1964 with 93 students, 24 women and 69 men, and has metamorphosed into a first class College of Education in Nigeria and in the West Africa sub-region. Presently, it has five schools – Arts and Social Sciences, Education, Languages, Sciences, and Vocational and Technical Education – with a total of 28 academic departments. The College is a combination of the various institutions that sprang up in the sixties to cater to the development of Manpower in secondary schools and teacher training colleges in the Western region. Teachers college (up to 1963), The Ransome Kuti College of Education, The Olunloyo College of Education and Ohio Teachers Project, Ondo all constituted the solid foundation on which it was built. See for instance, Adeyemi College of Education now boast of 9 Hostels in total which comprises 6 Female hostels and 3 Male hostels.

Schools/Faculties in Adeyemi College of Education 
The institution offers various programmes under the following Schools/Faculties:
 Education
 Sciences
 Arts and Social Sciences
 Languages
Vocational and Technical Education
The institution also runs the SIWES programme that enables students to gain practical experience while attached to workplaces.

University Status 
The federal government of Nigeria under the Goodluck Jonathan presidency upgraded the College to a full-fledged university of education in May 2015. However, the new administration of President Mohammed Buhari decided to put the new status on hold in August 2015 because of the absence of an enabling law. The National Assembly finally passed the Adeyemi Federal University Establishment bill in December 2018 and the bill was assented by the President of the Federal Republic of Nigeria in December 2021.

See also
List of colleges of education in Nigeria

References

External links
 www.aceondo.edu.ng
https://guardian.ng/appointments/akintunde-becomes-provost-of-adeyemi-college-of-education/
https://guardian.ng/features/college-unveils-inspire-2-drone-pioneers-ict-revolution-in-tertiary-institutions-2/

 
Ondo City
Federal colleges of education in Nigeria
1964 establishments in Nigeria
Educational institutions established in 1964
Universities and colleges in Ondo State